Tim Cunningham is an American actor and baseball coach. He is known for playing the recurring role of "Chuck" and "Tim" on 38 episodes of the American sitcom television series Cheers. Cunningham guest-starred in television programs including Beverly Hills, 90210, Remington Steele and Party of Five.

Coaching 
Cunningham served as a baseball coach in late–2000s. He replaced Mitch Miller and coached at the Harvard-Westlake School.

Filmography

Film

Television

References

External links 

Living people
Year of birth missing (living people)
American male television actors
American male film actors
American baseball coaches
20th-century American male actors
American sports coaches